Turnrow may refer to:

 A Headland (agriculture)
 A bi-annual journal of short fiction, poetry, visual art, and interviews, published by the University of Louisiana at Monroe